The Hollis City Hall and Jail, at 101 W. Jones St. in Hollis, Oklahoma, was built in 1939 as a Works Progress Administration project.

It is a two-story stone building with a flat roof with Modern Movement style.

References

City halls in Oklahoma
Jails in Oklahoma
Moderne architecture in Oklahoma
National Register of Historic Places in Harmon County, Oklahoma
Buildings and structures completed in 1939